Rio Grande's Last Race and Other Verses (1902) is the second collection of poems by Australian poet Banjo Paterson. It was released in hardback by Angus and Robertson in 1902, and features the poems "Rio Grande's Last Race", "Mulga Bill's Bicycle", "Saltbush Bill's Game Cock" and "Saltbush Bill's Second Fight".

The original collection includes 46 poems by the author that are reprinted from various sources. Later editions added further poems.

Contents

Critical reception

On its original publication in Australia The Brisbane Courier noted "One may always bid welcome to the rattling poems of "Banjo" Paterson, for they have in them an irresistible swing, they are singularly grippy in descriptiveness, and they are racy of the soil. The verses in the volume now to hand are racy of more than one soil, however; they give us racing, droving, and bush incidents of Australia, and they rattle out also pen and ink pictures of South Africa, and of grim war."

See also

 1902 in Australian literature
 1902 in poetry

References

External links
 
 

Poetry by Banjo Paterson
Australian poetry collections
1902 books
Angus & Robertson books